Be Real may refer to:

 BeReal, a social media photo sharing app where users post photos once a day
 "Be Real" (Kid Ink song), 2015
 "Be Real" (Krista Siegfrids song), 2016
 "Be Real" (Phoebe Ryan song), 2017
 "Be Real", a song by Chance McKinney
 "Be Real", a song by Tomorrow's Edition 
 "Be Real", a 2012 song by Melissa Etheridge on 4th Street Feeling
 "(Be Yourself) Be Real", a 1972 song by Al Kooper  on Naked Songs

See also
 B-Real (born 1970), American rapper
 B-Real, radio personality, The Toucher and Rich Show